is a Japanese Renju player. He won Renju World Championships in 1989 and 1991, and Renju Team World Championships in 2012. Up to 2020, he has been the Japan's Meijin title holder for 30 years. In 2019, Nakamura was awarded the 7th Lifetime Meijin title by the Japanese Renju Federation. Up to 2017, Nakamura has won the All Japan Renju Championship for 6 times, and the Kanto Renju Emperor Tournament for 12 times. In 1999, Nakamura played a "match of two titans" against the Estonian world champion Ando Meritee, with the result of 2,5-3,5.

References

Living people
Renju world champions
Japanese Renju players
Year of birth missing (living people)